The list of shipwrecks in 1808 includes ships sunk, wrecked or otherwise lost during 1808.

January

1 January

2 January

3 January

4 January

5 January

8 January

9 January

10 January

11 January

13 January

14 January

15 January

16 January

17 January

20 January

23 January

24 January

28 January

29 January

30 January

31 January

Unknown date

February

5 February

6 February

8 February

9 February

10 February

11 February

12 February

13 February

14 February

15 February

16 February

20 February

23 February

24 February

26 February

28 February

29 February

Unknown date

March

2 March

7 March

8 March

9 March

12 March

14 March

15 March

19 March

20 March

21 March

22 March

23 March

24 March

25 March

26 March

30 March

31 March

Unknown date

April

1 April

3 April

4 April

5 April

7 April

8 April

9 April

15 April

17 April

19 April

20 April

21 April

22 April

23 April

27 April

28 April

Unknown date

May

5 May

9 May

13 May

15 May

18 May

19 May

22 May

Unknown date

June

14 June

15 June

16 June

18 June

30 June

Unknown date

July

10 July

14 July

19 July

21 July

27 July

30 July

Unknown date

August

3 August

7 August

8 August

12 August

18 August

22 August

24 August

25 August

27 August

Unknown date

September

1 September

10 September

12 September

24 September

20 September

25 September

27 September

29 September

30 September

Unknown date

October

5 October

7 October

8 October

9 October

12 October

13 October

14 October

15 October

16 October

17 October

18 October

20 October

21 October

22 October

23 October

24 October

25 October

26 October

29 October

30 October

31 October

Unknown date

November

1 November

2 November

4 November

7 November

10 November

11 November

12 November

13 November

15 November

16 November

17 November

18 November

19 November

20 November

21 November

22 November

25 November

26 November

28 November

29 November

30 November

Unknown date

December

1 December

3 December

4 December

5 December

6 December

7 December

8 December

10 December

11 December

15 December

17 December

18 December

19 December

20 December

21 December

22 December

23 December

25 December

28 December

29 December

31 December

Unknown date

Unknown date

References

1808